The women's shot put event at the 1984 Summer Olympics in Los Angeles, California had an entry list of 13 competitors. The final was held on 3 August 1984.

Medalists

Abbreviations
All results shown are in metres

Records

Final

See also
 1982 Women's European Championships Shot Put (Athens)
 1983 Women's World Championships Shot Put (Helsinki)
 1984 Women's Friendship Games Shot Put (Prague)
 1986 Women's European Championships Shot Put (Stuttgart)
 1987 Women's World Championships Shot Put (Rome)

References

External links
 Results

S
Shot put at the Olympics
1984 in women's athletics
Women's events at the 1984 Summer Olympics